The women's welterweight is a competition featured at the 2017 World Taekwondo Championships, and was held at the Taekwondowon in Muju County, South Korea on June 26 and June 27. Welterweight were limited to a maximum of 67 kilograms in body mass.

Medalists

Results
Legend
DQ — Won by disqualification
P — Won by punitive declaration

Finals

Top half

Section 1

Section 2

Bottom half

Section 3

Section 4

References
Draw

External links
Official website

Women's 67
World